Vassal Abago Bagobagan Gadoengin (May 1, 1943 – December 15, 2004) was a political figure from the Pacific nation of Nauru.

Background
Vassal attended school in the United States. He attended Skagit Valley College, Mt. Vernon, Wa., in the late 1960s. He continued his education in Portland, Oregon in the early 1970s.

Before entering a political career, which he did not do until he was aged in his mid-50s, Gadoengin had been working as a teacher.

Political roles

Gadoengin was elected to parliament in 1997 winning the seat of Ruby Dediya and was re-elected in 2000. He served as Minister of Finance in the cabinet of Bernard Dowiyogo in March 2001. In 2003 he lost his seat to newcomer Marcus Stephen, but regained it after the 2004 snap elections.

Speaker of the Parliament of Nauru
He was elected Speaker of the Parliament of Nauru twice: from December 2002 to January 2003, and again on 26 October 2004. He was serving in this office when he died. Gadoengin was succeeded as Speaker by Valdon Dowiyogo.

See also
 Politics of Nauru

References

1943 births
2004 deaths
Finance Ministers of Nauru
Members of the Parliament of Nauru
Speakers of the Parliament of Nauru
People from Anetan District
20th-century Nauruan politicians
21st-century Nauruan politicians